Maurice McLafferty (7 August 1922 – January 1999) was a Scottish professional footballer who played in the Scottish League for St Mirren and in the English Football League as a full back for Sheffield United and Brighton & Hove Albion.

Life and career
McLafferty was born in Baillieston, Scotland, in 1922. He was on Celtic's books after the Second World War, represented the Royal Air Force at football in 1946, and played for Irish League club Glenavon, before signing for St Mirren in 1950. He made one appearance in the 1950–51 Scottish Division One season, and then moved to England to join Second Division club Sheffield United. Despite making 18 Second Division appearances, he was transfer-listed at the end of the season at a fee of £1,000. He rejected a return to Scottish football with Aberdeen in favour of remaining in England and dropping down a division with Brighton & Hove Albion.

Initially a reserve, McLafferty shared the left-back position with Reg Fox once Jack Mansell left the club in October 1952, and made 22 appearances in league and FA Cup combined. Both men lost their place to new arrival Jim Langley, and McLafferty moved into Southern League football with Dartford and Hastings United. After losing out to Frank Neary for the appointment as player-coach of Lewes, McLafferty took up the corresponding post at another Sussex County League club, Newhaven.

Off the field, McLafferty worked in Brighton & Hove Albion's fund-raising office and as steward of a gentlemen's social club. He died in Worthing, West Sussex, in 1999 at the age of 76.

References

1922 births
1999 deaths
People from Baillieston
Scottish footballers
Association football fullbacks
Celtic F.C. players
Glenavon F.C. players
St Mirren F.C. players
Sheffield United F.C. players
Brighton & Hove Albion F.C. players
Dartford F.C. players
Hastings United F.C. (1948) players
Newhaven F.C. players
Scottish Football League players
English Football League players
Southern Football League players
Royal Air Force airmen